Bacillus flexus is an aerobic, Gram-variable, rod-shaped, endospore-forming, oxidase positive bacteria. The endospores are ellipsoidal, located in central/paracentral, unswollen sporangia. In laboratory conditions, it produces opaque, creamish, raised margin colonies at 30  when incubated at 24–72 hrs. on Tryptic Soy Agar (TSA). These bacteria may be isolated from feces (poultry) and soil.

Human pathogenicity has not been well described at this time.

This species has been recently transferred into the genus Priestia. The correct nomenclature is Priestia flexa.

References

flexus